Willibrordus Ildefonsus Ignatius "Willibrord" van Beek (born 15 January 1949) is a retired Dutch politician and financial adviser. He is a member of the People's Party for Freedom and Democracy (VVD).

As a member of the People's Party for Freedom and Democracy (Volkspartij voor Vrijheid en Democratie, VVD) he was a member of the House of Representatives from 19 May 1998 to 19 September 2012. From 8 March until 29 June 2006 he was parliamentary leader. He focused on matters of public administration, administrative law and the defence.

Between October 2012 and 15 September 2013 he was Acting Mayor of Bernheze; he served until his appointment as the King's Commissioner of Utrecht. He served in an acting capacity until 1 January 2015; on 1 February 2019, he was succeeded by Hans Oosters.

Electoral history

Decorations

References

External links

Official
  W.I.I. (Willibrord) van Beek Parlement & Politiek

1949 births
Living people
Aldermen in North Brabant
Dutch corporate directors
Dutch financial advisors
Dutch nonprofit directors
King's and Queen's Commissioners of Utrecht
Knights of the Order of Orange-Nassau
Mayors in North Brabant
People from Bernheze
Members of the House of Representatives (Netherlands)
Members of the Provincial Council of North Brabant
Members of the Provincial-Executive of North Brabant
Politicians from Amsterdam
People from Cranendonck
People's Party for Freedom and Democracy politicians
20th-century Dutch politicians
21st-century Dutch politicians